The 84th Street station was a local station on the demolished IRT Third Avenue Line in Manhattan, New York City. It was originally built on December 9, 1878. The station had two side platforms and was served by local trains only. This station closed on May 12, 1955, with the ending of all service on the Third Avenue El south of 149th Street.

References

 
 

IRT Third Avenue Line stations
Railway stations in the United States opened in 1878
Railway stations closed in 1955
Former elevated and subway stations in Manhattan
1878 establishments in New York (state)
1955 disestablishments in New York (state)
Third Avenue